Chronicles of the Juice Man is the debut studio album by American rapper Juicy J, released on July 16, 2002 via North North with manufacturing and distribution from Hypnotize Minds. The album features guest appearances from Three 6 Mafia's Crunchy Black and Lord Infamous, as well as Juicy J's brother, Project Pat, whom many of the lyrics on the album refer following his to then-recent incarceration.

Track listing

Chart positions

References

Juicy J albums
2002 debut albums
Albums produced by Juicy J